American actor Oscar Isaac has received several accolades for his work, including one Golden Globe Award, National Board of Review Award and Australian Film Institute Award each. His career began as a teenager with a minor role in the film Illtown (1998), followed by parts on stage in Joseph Adler's 2000 productions of This Is Our Youth and Side Man. Isaac landed his first major role in the biblical drama film The Nativity Story (2007). He played Romeo alongside Lauren Ambrose in the Public Theater's Romeo and Juliet (2007). For much of the rest of the 2000s, Isaac played minor roles in films—the thriller The Life Before Her Eyes (2007), the biopic Che (2008), the spy thriller Body of Lies (2008) and the Spanish historical drama Agora (2009). He won the AACTA Award for Best Actor in a Supporting Role for his role as José Ramos-Horta in Balibo (2009). In 2010, Isaac played villain King John in Robin Hood. His profile increased with four roles in 2011. These included an asylum orderly in the fantasy Sucker Punch and an ex-convict in the critically acclaimed action drama Drive (2011). He had four film releases in 2012, including For Greater Glory, for which he was nominated for an ALMA Award for Favorite Movie Actor – Supporting Role.

In 2013, Isaac had his breakthrough playing the eponymous role of a struggling folk singer in the musical drama Inside Llewyn Davis, which resulted in several film offers. For the film, he was nominated for the Golden Globe Award for Best Actor – Motion Picture Musical or Comedy. He followed this by playing an ambitious man struggling to keep his business intact in a violent city in the crime drama A Most Violent Year (2014), where he contributed to the creation of his character's background. For his performance in the film, Isaac won a National Board of Review Award for Best Actor. In 2015, he portrayed the reclusive inventor of a gynoid in the science fiction film Ex Machina, and played his first leading role on television—the miniseries Show Me a Hero. His role in the latter garnered him a Golden Globe Award for Best Actor – Miniseries or Television Film. Isaac became a superstar after playing Poe Dameron in the Star Wars sequel trilogy (2015–2019) and Star Wars Resistance (2018–2020). He took on the role of the titular villain in the commercially successful superhero film X-Men: Apocalypse (2016).

In 2017, Isaac possibly became the first Latino actor to play Hamlet in a major US production after he was cast in the Public Theater's Hamlet. Isaac's work in 2018 included roles in the science fiction film Annihilation and the historical drama Operation Finale, the latter of which he also produced. He then reunited with A Most Violent Year director J. C. Chandor in the action adventure film Triple Frontier (2019). Two years later, he starred in the science fiction film Dune, the drama The Card Counter and the HBO miniseries Scenes from a Marriage. The lattermost garnered him a nomination for a Golden Globe Award for Best Actor – Miniseries or Television Film. In 2022, Isaac joined the Marvel Cinematic Universe by playing the titular superheroes in the miniseries Moon Knight, for which he was nominated for a MTV Movie Award for Best Hero; he also served as an executive producer for the show.

Filmography

Film

Television

Video games

Podcasts

Theatre

Awards and nominations

Notes

References

Sources

External links
 

American filmographies
Lists of awards received by American actor
Male actor filmographies